Choranthias salmopunctatus, the salmon-spotted jewelfish, is a species of marine ray-finned fish in the family Serranidae, the groupers and sea bass. It is endemic to Brazil where a small population of Anthias salmopunctatus have been spotted near St. Peter and St. Paul's archipelago. Upon resurfacing after a 30-year disappearance, this population of fish can now be found aggregating in relatively small groups.

References

Anthiinae
Fish of Brazil
Endemic fauna of Brazil
Fish described in 1981
Taxonomy articles created by Polbot